Alison Rich is an American actress, comedian, writer, and director. She is best known for her acting on The Goldbergs and The Other Two.

Life and career 
Rich was raised in Port Washington, Long Island, New York. She received her bachelor's degree from Harvard University.

Rich trained in improv and sketch comedy at UCB Theatre in New York. She joined the Saturday Night Live writing staff in 2014. She later wrote for Billy on the Street, and appeared on Best Week Ever, Late Night with Jimmy Fallon, Drunk History, Tuca & Bertie, Angie Tribeca, and 2 Broke Girls. Rich was a main cast member of the sketch comedy series Party Over Here (2016), and Rob Riggle's Ski Master Academy (2018). She had recurring roles on Resident Advisors (2015) and The Other Two (2021). Rich has been a supporting cast member on The Goldbergs since 2017, where she was also a writer for several years.

In 2018, Rich signed a pilot development deal with Broadway Video's digital production company Above Average. She wrote and starred in her directorial debut short film, The Other Morgan, which premiered at SXSW in 2021. Her second short film, Training Wheels, premiered at the 2022 Sundance Film Festival.

Filmography

Television

Film

Awards and nominations 
 2013 – IFC Out of the Box Award, New York Television Festival
 2013 – Best Actress Award, Independent Pilot Competition, New York Television Festival
2016 – Writers Guild of America Awards, Comedy/Variety Sketch Series, Nominee
2021 – Grand Jury Award, SXSW Film Festival, Nominee
2022 – Short Film Grand Jury Prize, Sundance Film Festival, Nominee

References

External links 
 Official website
 

Year of birth missing (living people)
Living people
21st-century American actresses
American sketch comedians
American women film directors
American women screenwriters
Harvard University alumni
People from Port Washington, New York
American women comedians